The J. R. R. Tolkien Professorship of English Literature and Language was established at the University of Oxford in 1980 and named after the author, poet, philologist and academic J. R. R. Tolkien. The inaugural holder was Douglas Gray.

List of J. R. R. Tolkien Professors 

 1980–1997: Douglas Gray, FBA
 1998–2003: Paul H. Strohm
 2004–2021: Vincent Gillespie, FBA, FSA, FRHistS
 2022-present: Marion Turner

References

1980 establishments in England
Professorships at the University of Oxford
Professor of English Literature and Language